Captive Andromache is an oil painting on a 197 cm × 407 cm canvas by Frederic Leighton produced in ca. 1888. The subject is from Homer's Iliad. The painting was purchased by Manchester City Council for £4,000 from the artist in 1889. It now hangs in Manchester Art Gallery

References

1888 paintings
Mythological paintings by Frederic Leighton
Collection of Manchester Art Gallery
Paintings based on the Iliad